The Borough of Blackpool is a local government district with unitary authority status and unparished area in the ceremonial county of Lancashire, England. It covers the large seaside town of Blackpool and includes notable suburbs such as South Shore, North Shore and the large village of Bispham.

The borough is bordered to the north and north-east by the Borough of Wyre (including Fleetwood, Cleveleys, Thornton and Poulton-le-Fylde), and to the south and south-east by Borough of Fylde (including Lytham St Annes), both of which are non-metropolitan districts in Lancashire. The western boundary is bounded by Morecambe Bay and the coast. Surrounding districts form part of the Blackpool Urban Area which covers all the unitary authority area.

History
On 1 April 1974, under the Local Government Act 1972, the pre-existing County Borough of Blackpool was reconstituted as a non-metropolitan district with the same boundaries as the county borough. Until 1998, Blackpool was administered as part of Lancashire County Council which was based in Preston. After the creation of unitary authorities by the government,  Blackpool and Blackburn were successful in gaining their own right to govern independent from the county council. Blackpool gained unitary authority status, as did Blackburn and it was renamed "Blackburn with Darwen".  these are the only two unitary authorities in Lancashire although they remain part of Lancashire for ceremonial purposes.

Localities in the borough

Anchorsholme
Bispham
Bloomfield
Brunswick
Churchtown
Claremont
Common Edge
Devonshire
Grange Park
Great Marton
Great Marton Moss
Great Marton Moss Side
Greenhill
Greenlands
Hawes Side
Highfurlong
Hoohill
Ingthorpe
Layton
Little Bispham
Little Carleton
Little Marton Moss Side
Little Norbreck
Marton
Marton Fold
Mereside
Moor Park
Norbreck
North Shore
Palatine
Queenstown
Revoe
South Shore
Squires Gate
Stanley Park
Starr Gate
Walker's Hill
Warbreck
Waterloo
Whiteholme

Government

Blackpool borough is administered by Blackpool Council currently under Labour control.

References

 
Local government districts of Lancashire
Unitary authority districts of England
NUTS 3 statistical regions of the United Kingdom
Unparished areas in Lancashire
Boroughs in England